Çiftlik is a town and district of Niğde Province in the Central Anatolia region of Turkey, 67 km from the town of Niğde, and 65 km from Aksaray. There is a much shorter route over the mountains to Niğde but that road is often under snow and closed in winter. Population is (2010) 29,183 of which 3,304 live in the town of Çiftlik.

Çiftlik is Turkish for farm, appropriately in this rural area which was previously known as Melendiz. 

Obsidian is found in the area.

Places of interest
 A number of extremely ancient burial mounds höyük.
 The hot spring and crater lake near the village of Narköy.

References

External links
 District governor's official website 
 District municipality's official website 
 A local news website 
 A web portal of Niğde 
 Yesilbor.com 
 information about cappadocia and ciftlik 

Cappadocia
Towns in Turkey
Populated places in Niğde Province
Districts of Niğde Province